Sar Tashtak is a village in Howmeh Rural District, in the Central District of Bam County, Kerman Province, Iran. At the 2006 census, its population was 37, in 11 families.

References 

Populated places in Bam County